Puyravault is the name of 2 communes in France:

 Puyravault, Charente-Maritime, in the Charente-Maritime department
 Puyravault, Vendée, in the Vendée department